This list of dog breeds includes both extant and extinct dog breeds, varieties and types. A research article on dog genomics published in Science/AAAS defines modern dog breeds as "a recent invention defined by conformation to a physical ideal and purity of lineage".

Extant breeds, varieties and types 
Note: not all dogs listed below are recognized breeds by an official breed registry that can certify the dog is a purebred, including The Kennel Club (TKC - 1873), the oldest and first official dog breed registry in the world, located in the United Kingdom, and the three oldest breed registries in North America, and largest in the world, including the American Kennel Club (AKC - 1884), United Kennel Club (UKC - 1898), and Canadian Kennel Club (CKC - 1888).

A–C

D–K

L–R

S–Z

Extinct breeds, varieties and types

Notes

References

Citations

Bibliography 
 
 
 
 
 
 
 
 
 
 
 
 
 
 

 
Breeds
D